Alfred E. Taylor (born August 12, 1957) is an American politician serving as a member of the New York State Assembly for the 71st district. A Democrat, Taylor's district includes portions of Hamilton Heights, Harlem, Washington Heights, and Inwood.

Early life and education
A lifelong resident of Harlem, Taylor was a troubled youth who was able to turn to judge Bruce Wright, who mentored him and gave him an interest in community service. Taylor then served in the Military Police Corps while earning his GED, then graduated from Lehman College. He later earned a Master of Divinity, with a concentration in church development, from the Alliance Theological Seminary.

Career 
Taylor served for many years as the chief of staff for his predecessor, Herman D. Farrell Jr., while also serving as a Democratic district leader and as the pastor of Infinity Mennonite Church.

New York State Assembly
Farrell, first elected in 1974, decided to step down midterm in 2017 at the age of 85.  Taylor, his chief of staff, had long been seen as the heir apparent for the seat. With Farrell vacating the seat midterm, New York state law allowed for the Democratic District committee for the Assembly district to select the candidate for the general election, bypassing a primary for seat. Taylor, being the district leader, who ultimately leads the district committee, easily was chosen as the candidate.

Taylor won the seat unopposed, and was sworn in soon after. Taylor was re-elected in 2018 after running unopposed.

A new purportedly grassroots non-profit organization, "New York 4 Harlem", that actively solicited donations of $500 to $5,000 was reported in 2018 to allegedly have been a front for Taylor and three other Harlem elected officials. In addition, a flyer organizing a free bus trip to Albany for a conference organized by the NY State Assn. of Black and Puerto Rican Legislators with New York 4 Harlem's name on it featured a picture of Taylor and the three other officials. Nonprofit organizations are not allowed to take part in campaign activity. The contact person for the event was a staffer working in the office of one of the other three legislators.

References

External links
New York State Assemblyman Al Taylor official site

Living people
Politicians from New York City
Military personnel from New York City
Lehman College alumni
Nyack College alumni
Democratic Party members of the New York State Assembly
People from Harlem
21st-century American politicians
1957 births